The 1962 Myers Brothers 200 was a NASCAR Grand National Series event that was held on June 16, 1962, at Bowman Gray Stadium in Winston-Salem, North Carolina.

Background
Bowman Gray Stadium is a NASCAR sanctioned  asphalt flat oval short track and longstanding football stadium located in Winston-Salem, North Carolina. It is one of stock car racing's most legendary venues, and is referred to as "NASCAR's longest-running weekly race track". Bowman Gray Stadium is part of the Winston-Salem Sports and Entertainment Complex and is home of the Winston-Salem State University Rams football team. It was also the home of the Wake Forest University football team from 1956 until Groves Stadium (later BB&T Field) opened in 1968.

Race report
The winner was Johnny Allen, who scored his first win by defeating Rex White by six seconds. While Rex White started the first 22 laps of the race with a commanding lead, Johnny Allen must have been racing real hard because gained the lead on lap 23 and he never lost the lead for the remaining 178 laps of the race. After the race, the total prize winnings given out to all the drivers were $3985 USD ($ when adjusted for inflation).

This was only time anyone has won a NASCAR Cup Series race using the #58 as their racing number. Notable crew chiefs on attendance for this race were Herman Beam, Bud Allman and Bud Moore.

The transition to purpose-built racecars began in the early 1960s and occurred gradually over that decade.  Changes made to the sport by the late 1960s brought an end to the "strictly stock" vehicles of the 1950s.

Qualifying

Finishing order
Section reference: 

 Johnny Allen (No. 58)
 Rex White (No. 4)
 Richard Petty (No. 43)
 Larry Thomas (No. 36)
 Joe Weatherly (No. 8)
 Wendell Scott (No. 34)
 Fred Harb (No. 17)
 Jimmy Pardue (No. 54)
 Harry Leake (No. 97)
 Jack Smith (No. 47)
 Ned Jarrett (No. 11)
 Curtis Crider (No. 62)
 Herman Beam (No. 19)
 G. C. Spencer* (No. 48)
 Jim Paschal* (No. 2)
 George Green* (No. 1)
 Stick Elliott* (No. 18)
 Buck Baker* (No. 87)
 Thomas Cox* (No. 60)

* Driver failed to finish race

Timeline
Section reference: 
 Start of race: Rex White started the race with the pole position.
 Lap 23: Johnny Allen managed to take over the lead from Rex White.
 Lap 51: Thomas Cox developed issues with his vehicle's brakes.
 Lap 112: Buck Baker's tires became problematic.
 Lap 122: A wheel bearing came loose off Stick Elliott's vehicle.
 Lap 145: A frame from George Green's vehicle became a safety hazard on the track.
 Lap 153: The rear end of Jim Paschal's vehicle managed to come off in an unsafe manner.
 Lap 172: G. C. Spencer's transmission developed major problems.
 Finish: Johnny Allen was officially declared the winner of the event.

References

Myers Brothers 200
Myers Brothers 200
NASCAR races at Bowman Gray Stadium